Francis Buller may refer to:

Francis Buller (died 1682) (1630–1682)
Francis Buller (Parliamentarian)
Francis Buller (politician) (1723–1764), MP for West Looe
Sir Francis Buller, 1st Baronet (1746–1800), judge
Sir Francis Buller-Yarde-Buller, 2nd Baronet (1767–1833), of the Buller baronets
Francis Alexander Waddilove Buller, British Royal Navy officer

See also
Buller (disambiguation)